Governor Russell may refer to:

Charles H. Russell (1903–1989), 20th Governor of Nevada
Daniel Lindsay Russell (1845–1908), 49th Governor of North Carolina
Donald S. Russell (1906–1998), 107th Governor of South Carolina
Fraser Russell (1876–1952), Governor of Southern Rhodesia from 1934 to 1935, in 1942, and in 1946
Lee M. Russell (1875–1943), 40th Governor of Mississippi
Oliver Russell, 2nd Baron Ampthill (1869–1935), Governor of Madras from 1900 to 1904
Richard Russell Jr. (1897–1971), 66th Governor of Georgia
William E. Russell (politician) (1857–1896), 37th Governor of Massachusetts